The International Journal of e-Collaboration is a quarterly peer-reviewed academic journal that covers the interdisciplinary field of e-collaboration at the intersection of human-computer interaction, computer-supported cooperative work, and electronic commerce. It was established in 2005 and is published by IGI Global.

Editors 
The following persons have been editors-in-chief of the journal:
 2017-present: Mehdi Khosrow-Pour (Information Resources Management Association)
 2004-2017: Founding Editor: Ned Kock (Texas A&M International University)

Abstracting and indexing
The journal is abstracted and indexed in the ACM Digital Library, Inspec, PsycINFO, and Scopus.

References

External links
 

Business and management journals
Human–computer interaction journals
Publications established in 2005
Quarterly journals
English-language journals
e-Collaboration, International Journal of